The BB 25200 is a class of electric locomotives in service with the French railways SNCF, built by Materiel de Traction Electrique (MTE) between 1967 and 1976. They are dual voltage locomotives working off both 1500 V DC and 25 kV 50 Hz AC. It is the dual voltage equivalent of the BB 9200 and BB 16000 classes.

Construction
The initial batch of 45 locomotives, numbers BB 25201–BB 25246, was built between 1965 and 1967. Subsequently, a further 5, numbers BB 25247–BB 25251, were built in 1975.  In addition 4 Class BB 25150, numbers BB 25180, BB 25184, BB 25194 and BB 25195, were converted in 2003.

Service use

They were first used on passenger services from Paris to Le Mans and Rennes until replaced by Class BB 22200 locomotives. After that they were redeployed to other services from Paris, mainly to Le Havre.

In 1987, 18 members of the class, BB 25201, BB 25202 and BB 25236–BB 25251, were converted to push-pull operation and redesignated as Class BB 25200R. They were allocated to Chambéry for services between Grenoble and Lyon. In addition they worked services out of Paris to Beauvais, Le Mans and Rennes. The class had all been withdrawn by 2012.

Names
Four members of the class received names.

References

25200
B-B locomotives
25200
BB 25200
Standard gauge locomotives of France
Passenger locomotives